This is a list of common tapas dishes. Tapas are a wide variety of appetizers, or snacks, in Spanish cuisine. They may be cold (such as mixed olives and cheese) or warm (such as chopitos, which are battered, fried baby squid).
In select restaurants and bars in Spain, tapas have evolved into an entire and sophisticated cuisine. In Spain, patrons of tapas can order many different tapas and combine them to make a full meal. In some Central American countries, such snacks are known as bocas.

Tapas

See also

 List of Spanish dishes

References

Further reading

External links
 

Appetizers
Tapas
Tapas